"Drowning" is a song recorded by American recording artist Mario for his fifth studio album Dancing Shadows and was released alongside its music video on July 20, 2018, through his own label New Citizen and Empire Distribution as the album's lead single. The song was written and produced by Mario, xSDTRK and Daecolm Holland, with additional songwriting credits from Milton Adams II and Jake Gosling. Lyrically, the song is about a man being torn between two women.

The song garnered favorable reviews from most critics, with praise towards its production and Mario's vocal delivery

Background and release
Mario spoke with the FunX radio station during the Oh My! Music Festival in June 2018, he revealed that he would release the lead single off the album.

Critical reception
Singersroom said the song, "showcases Mario’s vocal growth and eargasmic falsetto that takes hold and doesn’t let go over a simmering and stark production". The Musical Hype gave the song three in a half stars out of five.

Music video
The music video premiered along with the song on July 20, 2018.

Live performances
Mario performed "Drowning" during the live televised segment of The Wendy Williams Show in October 2018.

Track listing

Credits and personnel
Credits were adapted from Tidal.

 Mario – songwriting, production
 Daecolm – songwriting, production
 xSDTRK – songwriting, production
 Jake Gosling – songwriting
 Milton Adams II – songwriting

Charts

Release history

References

2018 singles
2018 songs
Empire Distribution singles
Mario (singer) songs
Songs written by Jake Gosling
Songs written by Mario (American singer)